The Vitamin Shoppe (formerly Vitamin Shoppe Industries, Inc., stylized as theVitaminShoppe) is an American, New Jersey-based retailer of nutritional supplements. It also operated three stores in Canada under the name VitaPath from January 2013 until March 2016. The company provides approximately 7,000 different SKUs of supplements through its retail stores and over 17,000 different SKUs of supplements through its retail websites.

In 2002, Vitamin Shoppe Industries was sold to an affiliate of Bear Stearns Merchant Banking, a private equity unit of Bear Stearns, for approximately $310 million.

The Vitamin Shoppe held an initial public offering on October 26, 2009. The company made $751.5 million in net sales in fiscal 2010 and had a market capitalization of over $1 billion. Since attaining its peak in February 2013 the stock has lost more than 90% of its value as of August 2017.

History
Jeffrey Horowitz founded The Vitamin Shoppe in 1977. In August 2019, Franchise Group, Inc announced the acquisition of The Vitamin Shoppe.

In August 2020, The Vitamin Shoppe reported it has hired Laura Coffey as Executive Vice-President, Chief Financial Officer. Within this position, Ms. Coffey is in charge of Corporate Finance, Financial Reporting and Evaluation, Risk Control, Accounting, Internal Audit, Tax and Real Estate.

Products

The Vitamin Shoppe's retail stores and online sites carry a line of nutritional supplements with supplementary lines, such as FitFactor, NatureFuel, ProBio Care,  and the Bodytech brand of sports supplements. In addition to their own brands, the company carries third-party lines, including professional and specialized lines.

A 2015 study, led by Dr. Pieter A. Cohen of Harvard, found that three supplements — JetFuel Superburn, JetFuel T-300 and MX-LS7 — sold at Vitamin Shoppe contained BMPEA. In response, Vitamin Shoppe removed these products from shelves because the safety of these supplements were in question and may not comply with F.D.A. regulations.

Reception
On January 19, 2007, independent laboratory ConsumerLab.com found 32.8 micrograms of lead per daily serving in Vitamin Shoppe's "Especially for Women" multivitamin. 15.3 micrograms is more than ten times the amount of lead permitted without a warning label in California, the only state to regulate lead in supplements. The amount of lead found was found to cause cancer and death to 29 people nationwide. In the wake of extensive adverse media coverage, Vitamin Shoppe withdrew the product, but in a statement made by CEO Tom Tolworthy denied it had any proof the vitamins were contaminated and asserted that, despite the high lead levels found in the Consumer Labs tests, its vitamins were manufactured in accordance with "good manufacturing practices."

On June 15, 2011, Vitamin Shoppe's Ultimate Woman Gold multivitamin was tested by ConsumerLab.com in their Multivitamin and Multimineral Supplements Review of 38 of the leading multivitamin/multimineral products sold in the U.S. and Canada. This multivitamin passed ConsumerLab's test, which included testing of selected index elements, their ability to disintegrate in solution per United States Pharmacopeia guidelines, lead contamination threshold set in California Proposition 65, and meeting U.S. Food and Drug Administration (FDA) labeling requirements.

References

Vitamin Shoppe Company History.  Funding Universe 
New Vitamin Shoppe Leader.  New York Times, June 22, 2001
Spinoff is unspun.  New York Times, January 17, 2001

External links

Companies formerly listed on the New York Stock Exchange
Companies based in Hudson County, New Jersey
Health food stores
2002 mergers and acquisitions
American companies established in 1977
Retail companies established in 1977
Food retailers of the United States
Nutritional supplement companies of the United States
2009 initial public offerings
2019 mergers and acquisitions
Secaucus, New Jersey
1977 establishments in New Jersey